Glenoides is a genus of moths in the family Geometridae described by James Halliday McDunnough in 1920.

Species
Glenoides lenticuligera Blanchard, 1973
Glenoides texanaria (Hulst, 1888)

References

Boarmiini